Wilf Diedricks (6 March 1945 – 18 August 2009) was a South African cricket umpire. He stood in one Test match, South Africa vs. India, in 1992 and 31 ODI games between 1992 and 2001.

See also
 List of Test cricket umpires
 List of One Day International cricket umpires

References

1945 births
2009 deaths
Sportspeople from Cape Town
South African Test cricket umpires
South African One Day International cricket umpires